The small-mouth righteye flounder (Nematops microstoma) is a flatfish of the family Pleuronectidae. Its natural habitat is the tropical waters of the southwest Pacific.

Range
As of 2011 the small-mouth righteye flounder has been discovered at only two locations, both in the southwest Pacific: the Admiralty Islands, where it was first described by Albert Günther in 1880, and the Gilbert Islands.

Description
The large-scale right-eye flounder is, as its name suggests, a right-eyed flatfish. It has a slender body, 2.3 times long as it is wide, with a short pectoral fin.

Diet
The diet of the large-scale right-eye flounder consists of small zoobenthos organisms.

Nomenclature
The species name, microstoma, is derived from the Greek μικρὸς (mikros), meaning "small", and στόμα (stoma), meaning "mouth".

References

small-mouth righteye flounder
small-mouth righteye flounder
small-mouth righteye flounder